Melvin LaThomas Brimm, better known by his middle name LaThomas, is a United States singer-songwriter, vocal producer, dancer-choreographer, and actor.

Life
Brimm was born and raised in Fort Lauderdale, Florida. He attended Florida A & M University, Florida Memorial University, and OmniTech Institute. He left Florida Agriculture & Mechanical University mid sophomore year in 2007 to pursue his music career in Atlanta, Georgia. Having already received writing credits for writing and producing for Tiffany Villereal overseas project prior to moving to Atlanta, he used that to get easier access to producers, executives, and other artists. LaThomas initially lived in a UHaul truck and took showers in different hotels for almost a month upon his arrival in Atlanta.

LaThomas provided vocal production on Pussycat Dolls single "Whatcha Think About That", the second single from their second studio album Doll Domination, which featured guest vocals from Missy Elliott and was released on September 9, 2008, on Interscope Records. It sampled the song "Je m'appelle Jane" by Jane Birkin and Mickey 3D.

Writing and vocal production credits
 Tiffany Villarreal - "Erotic" from the self-titled album
 The Pussycat Dolls ft. Missy Elliott - "Whatcha Think About That" from the album Doll Domination (Vocal production)
 Monica - "Let Your Man Go" from her album Still Standing
 Jamie Foxx - "Phonebone"
 Dru Hill - "Glass Table"

References

External links
 https://www.myspace.com/lathomas2

1987 births
Living people
20th-century African-American male singers
American dance musicians
American male pop singers
Musicians from Fort Lauderdale, Florida
Writers from Fort Lauderdale, Florida
21st-century American male singers
21st-century American singers
21st-century African-American male singers